Hypophonia is soft speech, especially resulting from a lack of coordination in the vocal musculature. This condition is a common presentation in Parkinson's disease. This condition is generally treated with voice training programs, use of shorter sentences, breathing exercises, and muscle training exercises for vocal cords.

Further research
Doctors at the Indiana University of Pennsylvania have proposed a novel treatment for hypophonic voice: Twang therapy.

References

Symptoms and signs: Speech and voice
Parkinson's disease